Xenolumpenus is a monotypic genus of marine ray-finned fishes belonging to the family Stichaeidae, the pricklebacks and shannies. Its only species is Xenolumpenus longipterus which is found in the northwestern Pacific Ocean.

References

Lumpeninae
Fish described in 2009
Monotypic ray-finned fish genera